Scythris potentillella is a moth of the family Scythrididae first described by the German entomologist Philipp Christoph Zeller in 1847. It is found in Asia Minor and Europe.

Description
The wingspan is 8–12 mm. The forewings are rust bown, with fine lighter scales. Adults are on wing from May to August, possibly in two generations per year.

The larvae feed on common sorrel (Rumex acetosa) and sheep's sorrel (Rumex acetosella) and can be found in April and May. They are brown with a light brown head and live within a silken web at the base of the stem.

Distribution
It is found from most of Europe (except Ireland, Portugal, Italy, most of the Balkan Peninsula, Ukraine, Latvia and Estonia) to Asia Minor. The habitat consists of dry sandy areas.

References

potentillella
Moths described in 1847
Moths of Asia
Moths of Europe
Taxa named by Philipp Christoph Zeller